Michael J. Klarman (born 1959) is an American legal historian and scholar of constitutional law. Currently, Klarman is the Kirkland & Ellis Professor at Harvard Law School. Formerly, he was James Monroe Distinguished Professor of Law, Professor of History, and Elizabeth D. and Richard A. Merrill Research Professor at the University of Virginia School of Law.

Early life and education 
Klarman grew up in Baltimore. His father, Herbert E. Klarman, was a public health economist. He is the brother of investor Seth Klarman.

Klarman holds a J.D. from Stanford Law School, a D.Phil. from Oxford University (where he was a Marshall Scholar) and an M.A. and B.A. from the University of Pennsylvania.  After his graduation from law school, he clerked for then-Judge Ruth Bader Ginsburg when she was on the United States Court of Appeals for the District of Columbia Circuit.

Scholarship 

Klarman specializes in the constitutional history of race.  He contends that the Supreme Court of the United States has historically been hostile to the rights of minorities and has not consistently enforced constitutional protections for them. Klarman argues that civil rights protections arise out of social mores from which the court takes its cue.

Klarman has also defended political process theory as a method of constitutional interpretation.

Awards
 2005 Bancroft Prize

Works
 Discussion between Klarman and Michael W. McConnell regarding Brown v. Board of Education
  
Response to McConnell:  
Response to Klarman: 
  
  Preview.
  Preview.
  Preview.

References

External links

"Interview with Michael J. Klarman, Winner of the 2005 Bancroft Prize", History News Network, 4-18-05
"Book Excerpt: Unfinished Business", Virginia Law Review, February 18, 2008

Living people
Alumni of the University of Oxford
Harvard Law School faculty
University of Pennsylvania alumni
University of Virginia School of Law faculty
Stanford Law School alumni
21st-century American historians
21st-century American male writers
Marshall Scholars
Bancroft Prize winners
1959 births
American male non-fiction writers